Alain Veinstein (born 17 August 1942, in Cannes) is a poet and writer, winner of the Mallarmé prize and a host and producer of radio.

Biography
Since 1978, Alain Veinstein is also the voice of the nights of France Culture with interviews on the program Overnight and broadcasts, Surprised by the night, and surprised by the poetry.  He created "The magnetic Nights" in 1978.

He interviewed Marguerite Duras.

Veinstein is essayist Laure Adler's husband.

Works

Fiction 
 (The Piano Tuner). Calmann-Levy (1996) – "The narrator, who never knew his father, was raised by his grandfather, a dark and quiet man who worked as a gravedigger. When, in turn it becomes father words intended for his son missed. A novel about the incompatibility between human beings and on the descent.
The Interviewer. Calmann-Levy (2002) – "The interviewer is a radio presenter for a literary program, viewers of all these writers. A day to force the speeches too well prepared, it feels to unlearn any language not to hear or understand ... "
 "The life of a Parisian art dealer in the Rue de Lappe somewhat disillusioned.
  (The Score). Grasset and Folio (2006) – "The man that I hardly ever approached in the flesh, I have always regarded as a kind of monster, a butcher ..."
Dancing. The threshold then Folio (2006) – "The Story of a man who decides, after having spent years writing enclosed within four walls, to take his life last arm to the waist."

Non Fiction

Poetry

Anthologies

Notes and references

1942 births
Living people
French poets
People from Cannes
French radio presenters
French radio producers
French male poets
Radio France people